"The Wind Blows" is a poem by Georgian poet Galaktion Tabidze. It is a sad poem, full of imagery and sentiments, and is well known in Georgia today. The Georgian version uses alliteration, repetition and rhyme, and like all his poems, is musical. It was written in 1920.

The poem (translation)
(modern translation)
Blowing wind, blowing wind, blowing wind,
In the breeze flying leaves night through... 
Group of trees, troop of trees roundly swaying, 
Where are you, where are you, where are you?

Falling rain, falling snow, falling snow, 
How to find, when to find never know! 
Pure of yours image rolls tired my mind
Everyday, every step, every time! 

Drizzling sky misty thoughts on the field... 
Blowing wind, blowing wind, blowing wind!

Translated by Nino Vepkhvadze

Whirls the wind, whirls the wind, whirls the wind
And the leaves whirl from wind still to wind…
Rows of trees, lines of trees bend in arch,
Where art thou, where art thou, why so far?..
How it rains, how it snows, how it snows,
Where to find, where to find... Never know!
But pursued, but pursued by your eyes
All the time, everywhere, every time!..
Distant skies drizzle thoughts mixed with mist…
Whirls the wind, whirls the wind, whirls the wind!..

Translated by Innes Merabishvili

References

1920 poems
Georgian poems
Poems about the wind